The Norbury Estate originated as a London County Council cottage estate constructed between 1901 and 1920 at Norbury in what is now the north of the London Borough of Croydon. It was declared a conservation area in 2008.

The site was a former brickfield, and the clay recovered was fired to make bricks for this estate and Totterdown Fields.

The estate was influenced by Ebenezer Howard's Garden city movement and the Arts and Crafts movement, with high quality external detailing and an open setting with privet hedges, front gardens and wide grass verges.

Design

Location
The estate is in the London Borough of Croydon, just west of the A23 and south of Norbury Station. It is bounded by Palmers Road, Darcy Road, Northborough Road and Tylecroft Road.

See also
Old Oak and Wormholt

References
Notes

Bibliography

External links

Buildings and structures in the London Borough of Croydon